The 40th Cannes Film Festival was held from 7 to 19 May 1987. The Palme d'Or went to the Sous le soleil de Satan by Maurice Pialat, a choice which was considered "highly controversial" and the prize was given under the jeers of the public. Pialat is quoted to have retorted "You don’t like me? Well, let me tell you that I don’t like you either!"

The festival opened with Un homme amoureux, directed by Diane Kurys and closed with Aria, directed by Robert Altman, Bruce Beresford, Bill Bryden, Jean-Luc Godard, Derek Jarman, Franc Roddam, Nicolas Roeg, Ken Russell, Charles Sturridge and Julien Temple. The 1987 Festival also paid tribute to Federico Fellini.

Juries

Main competition
The following people were appointed as the Jury of the 1987 feature film competition:
Yves Montand, French-Italian actor and singer (Jury President)
Danièle Heymann, French film critic and journalist
Elem Klimov, Soviet Russian director
Gérald Calderon, French director
Jeremy Thomas, British producer
Jerzy Skolimowski, Polish director, screenwriter, and actor
Nicola Piovani, Italian composer
Norman Mailer, American novelist
Theo Angelopoulos, Greek director, screenwriter, and producer

Camera d'Or
The following people were appointed as the Jury of the 1987 Camera d'Or:
Maurice Leroux (composer) President
 Bernard Jubard
Claude Weisz (director)
 Emmanuel Carriau (cinephile)
 Freddy Buache (journalist)
 M. Hidalgo (journalist)
 Michael Kutza (cinephile)
 Michel Ciment (critic)

Official selection

In competition - Feature film
The following feature films competed for the Palme d'Or:

 Aria by Robert Altman, Bruce Beresford, Bill Bryden, Jean-Luc Godard, Derek Jarman, Franc Roddam, Nicolas Roeg, Ken Russell, Charles Sturridge, Julien Temple
 Barfly by Barbet Schroeder
 The Belly of an Architect by Peter Greenaway
 Chronicle of a Death Foretold (Cronaca di una morte annunciata) by Francesco Rosi
 Dark Eyes (Oci ciornie) by Nikita Mikhalkov
 La famiglia by Ettore Scola
 Field of Honor (Champ d'honneur) by Jean-Pierre Denis
 The Glass Menagerie by Paul Newman
 Repentance (Monanieba) by Tengiz Abuladze
 The Last Manuscript (Az utolsó kézirat) by Károly Makk
 A Man in Love (Un homme amoureux) by Diane Kurys
 Pierre and Djemila (Pierre et Djemila) by Gérard Blain
 Prick Up Your Ears by Stephen Frears
 Shinran: Path to Purity (Shinran: Shiroi michi) by Rentarō Mikuni
 Shy People by Andrei Konchalovsky
 Subway to the Stars (Um Trem para as Estrelas) by Carlos Diegues
 Under the Sun of Satan (Sous le soleil de Satan) by Maurice Pialat
 Wings of Desire (Der Himmel über Berlin) by Wim Wenders
 Yeelen by Souleymane Cissé
 Zegen by Shohei Imamura

Un Certain Regard
The following films were selected for the competition of Un Certain Regard:

 A Gathering of Old Men by Volker Schlöndorff
 A Month in the Country by Pat O'Connor
 And the Pursuit of Happiness by Louis Malle
 Babette's Feast (Babettes Gaestebud) by Gabriel Axel
 Blind Chance (Przypadek) by Krzysztof Kieślowski
 The Distant Land (Das weite Land) by Luc Bondy
 Epidemic by Lars von Trier
 A Girl from Hunan (Xiangnu xiaoxiao) by Xie Fei and U Lan
 Hôtel de France by Patrice Chéreau
 The House of Bernarda Alba (La casa de Bernarda Alba) by Mario Camus
 Hud by Vibeke Løkkeberg
 Iron Earth, Copper Sky (Yer demir gök bakir) by Zülfü Livaneli
 Italian Postcards (Cartoline italiane) by Memè Perlini
 Jenatsch by Daniel Schmid
 The Serpent's Way (Ormens väg på hälleberget) by Bo Widerberg
 A Simple Death (Prostaya smert) by Alexander Kaidanovsky
 Robinsonada or My English Grandfather (Robinzoniada, anu chemi ingliseli Papa) by Nana Djordjadze
 Sofia by Alejandro Doria
 Someone to Love by Henry Jaglom
 A Successful Man (Un hombre de éxito) by Humberto Solás

Films out of competition
The following films were selected to be screened out of competition:

 Aida by Clemente Fracassi
 The Black Cannon Incident (Hēi Pào Shìjiàn) by Huang Jianxin
 Boris Godunov by Vera Stroyeva
 Caméra arabe by Férid Boughedir
 Le cinéma dans les yeux by Laurent Jacob, Gilles Jacob
 Don Quixote (Don Quichotte) by Georg Wilhelm Pabst
 Feathers by John Ruane
 Intervista by Federico Fellini
 Good morning Babilonia by Paolo and Vittorio Taviani
 Hôtel du Paradis by Jana Bokova
 L'Inhumaine by Marcel L'Herbier
 Louise by Abel Gance
 Macbeth by Claude d'Anna
 The Medium (Il medium) by Gian Carlo Menotti
 Pagliacci by Franco Zeffirelli
 Radio Days by Woody Allen
 Raising Arizona by the Coen brothers
 Return of a Citizen (Awdat mowatin) by Mohamed Khan
 Slam Dance by Wayne Wang
 Something Wild by Jonathan Demme
 The Sentimental Bloke by Raymond Longford
 The Whales of August by Lindsay Anderson
 Tough Guys Don't Dance by Norman Mailer
 Wahnfried (Richard et Cosima) by Peter Patzak

Short film competition
The following short films competed for the Short Film Palme d'Or:

 Doigté by Gyula Nagy
 Imagine by Zbigniew Rybczynski
 L'homme Qui Plantait des Arbres by Frédéric Back
 La Mort Soudaine et Prématurée du Colonel K.K. by Milos Radovic
 The Four Wishes (Les Quatre Vœux) by Michel Ocelot
 Maestro by Alex Zamm
 Palisade by Laurie McInnes
 Pleines de Grâce by Nicole Van Goethem
 Your Face by Bill Plympton
 Transatlantique by Bruce Krebs
 Academy Leader Variations by Martial Wannaz, Krzysztof Kiwerski, Stanislaw Lenartowicz, David Ehrlich, Jane Aaron, Skip Battaglia, Paul Glabicki, George Griffin, Al Jarnow, Piotr Dumala, Daniel Suter, Yan Ding Xian, A. D., Hu Jin Qing, Lin Wen Xiao, He Yu Men, Chang Guang Xi, Georges Schwizgebel, Claude Luyet, Jerzy Kucia

Parallel sections

International Critics' Week
The following feature films were screened for the 26th International Critics' Week (26e Semaine de la Critique):

 Dead Man's Letters (Pisma myortvogo cheloveka) by Konstantin Lopushansky (Soviet Union)
 Ngati by Barry Barclay (New Zealand)
 Yam Daabo by Idrissa Ouedraogo (Burkina Faso)
 The Tree We Hurt (To dendro pou pligoname) by Dimos Avdeliodis (Greece)
 Angelus novus by Pasquale Misuraca (Italy)
 Où que tu sois by Alain Bergala (France)

Directors' Fortnight
The following films were screened for the 1987 Directors' Fortnight (Quinzaine des Réalizateurs):

 Diary of a Mad Old Man by Lili Rademakers
 Dilan by Erden Kiral
 Guardian Angel (Andjeo Cuvar) by Goran Paskaljevic
 Heaven by Diane Keaton
 Home of the Brave by Laurie Anderson
 A Hungarian Fairy Tale (Hol Volt, Hol Nem Volt) by Gyula Gazdag
 I've Heard the Mermaids Singing by Patricia Rozema
 Made in U.S.A. by Ken Friedman
 Malom a pokolban by Gyula Maar
 Mascara by Patrick Conrad
 Matewan by John Sayles
 Night Zoo (Un zoo la nuit) by Jean-Claude Lauzon
 Panorama du cinéma sud-africain indépendant (director not stated)
 The Photograph (I Photographia) by Nicos Papatakis
 Rita, Sue and Bob Too by Alan Clarke
 Shadows in Paradise (Varjoja paratiisissa) by Aki Kaurismäki
 Street Smart by Jerry Schatzberg
 The Surfer by Frank Shields
 Wedding in Galilee (Urs al-Jalil) by Michel Khleifi
 Wish You Were Here by David Leland

Awards

Official awards
The following films and people received the 1987 Official selection awards:
Palme d'Or: Under the Sun of Satan (Sous le soleil de Satan) by Maurice Pialat
Grand Prix: Repentance (Monanieba) by Tengiz Abuladze
Best Director: Wim Wenders for Wings of Desire (Der Himmel über Berlin)
Best Actress: Barbara Hershey for Shy People
Best Actor: Marcello Mastroianni for Dark Eyes (Oci ciornie)
Best Artistic Contribution: Stanley Myers (composer) for Prick Up Your Ears
Jury Prize:
 Shinran: Path to Purity (Shinran: Shiroi michi) by Rentarō Mikuni
 Yeelen by Souleymane Cissé
40th Anniversary Prize: Intervista by Federico Fellini
Golden Camera
Caméra d'Or: Robinsonada or My English Grandfather (Robinzoniada, anu chemi ingliseli Papa) by Nana Djordjadze
Short films
Short Film Palme d'Or: Palisade by Laurie McInnes
Second Prize: Academy Leader Variations by David Ehrlich
Third Prize: La Mort Soudaine et Prématurée du Colonel K.K. (Iznenadna i prerana smrt pukovnika K.K) by Milos Radovic

Independent awards
FIPRESCI Prizes
Repentance (Monanieba) by Tengiz Abuladze (In competition)
Wedding in Galilee (Urs al-jalil) by Michel Khleifi (Directors' Fortnight)
Wish You Were Here by David Leland (Directors' Fortnight)
Commission Supérieure Technique
 Technical Grand Prize: Le cinéma dans les yeux by Gilles Jacob, Laurent Jacob
Ecumenical Jury
 Prize of the Ecumenical Jury: Monanieba by Tengiz Abuladze
 Ecumenical Jury - Special Mention: Babettes gæstebud by Gabriel Axel & Yeelen by Souleymane Cissé
Award of the Youth
Foreign Film: I've Heard the Mermaids Singing by Patricia Rozema

References

Media
INA: Anniversary evening: the Festival is 40 years old (commentary in French)
INA: List of winners of the 1987 festival (commentary in French)

External links

1987 Cannes Film Festival (web.archive)
Official website Retrospective 1987 
Cannes Film Festival Awards for 1987 at Internet Movie Database

Cannes Film Festival
Cannes Film Festival
Cannes Film Festival
Cannes